This page shows the results of the Diving Competition for men and women at the 1975 Pan American Games, held from October 12 to October 26, 1975 in Mexico City, Mexico. There were two events, for both men and women.

Men's competition

3m Springboard

10m Platform

Women's competition

3m Springboard

10m Platform

Medal table

See also
 Diving at the 1976 Summer Olympics

References
 Sports 123

1975 Pan American Games
1975
1975 in diving
International aquatics competitions hosted by Mexico